This is a list of women artists who were born in Trinidad and Tobago or whose artworks are closely associated with that country.

A
 Sybil Atteck (1911–1975), pioneering Trinidadian woman painter
 Nicole Awai (born 1966), multimedia artist, currently residing and working in Austin, Texas.

B
 Cheryl Byron (c. 1947–2003), visual artist

C 

 Vera Cudjoe (born 1928), actress, producer, and educator; founder of Black Theatre Canada

L
 Amy Leong Pang (1908–1989), painter

M
 Althea McNish (c. 1933–2020), textile designer

N
 Wendy Nanan (born 1955), painter and sculptor

S
 Roberta Silva (born 1971), sculptor, installation artist; now in Italy

See also

 Culture of Trinidad and Tobago
 List of Tobagonians
 List of Trinidadians
 Lists of women artists

References

Artists, women
Artists
Trinidad and Tobago